Soraida tenebricosa is a species of tephritid or fruit flies in the genus Soraida of the family Tephritidae.

Distribution
Indonesia.

References

Tephritinae
Insects described in 1941
Diptera of Africa